Edward Timms (1937 in Windlesham, England – 21 November 2018 in Brighton, England) OBE, FBA was Research Professor and a former director of the Centre for German-Jewish Studies (which he founded in 1994) at University of Sussex. His work mainly focused on Karl Kraus and Freud. Timms was also a Life Fellow of Gonville and Caius College, Cambridge His two-volume work Karl Kraus – Apocalyptic Satirist (1986 and 2005) is concerned with Kraus's satirical responses to Hapsburg Vienna, his rejection of both the First World War and Nazism. Kraus had been the subject of his PhD.

He died on 21 November 2018 at the age of 81.

Works
 Karl Kraus, Apocalyptic Satirist: Culture and Catastrophe in Habsburg Vienna (1986) Yale University Press  reviews:    
 Karl Kraus, Apocalyptic Satirist: The Post-War Crisis and the Rise of the Swastika (2005)
 Karl Kraus Und Die Fackel: Aufsatze Zur Rezeptionsgeschichte = Reading Karl Kraus Essays on the Reception of Die Fackel  (German) (with G. J. Carr)
 Theatre and Performance in Austria: From Mozart to Jelinek (editor, with Richie Robertson)
 Vienna 1900: from Altenberg to Wittgenstein (editor, with Ritchie Robertson). Edinburgh: Edinburgh University Press, c1990
 Taking up the Torch, Sussex University Press, 2011

Decorations and awards
 2002: Karl von Vogelsang State Prize for the History of Science Society
 2008: Austrian Cross of Honour for Science and Art, 1st class

Notes

External links 
 Professor Edward Timms at The British Academy

1937 births
2018 deaths
Academics of the University of Sussex
Recipients of the Austrian Cross of Honour for Science and Art, 1st class
Fellows of the British Academy
Fellows of Gonville and Caius College, Cambridge
Officers of the Order of the British Empire